Chalybea mutisiana is a species of plant in the family Melastomataceae. It is endemic to Boyacá, Cauca, and Santander in Colombia.

References

mutisiana
Endangered plants
Endemic flora of Colombia
Taxonomy articles created by Polbot